Babe Rainbow is the moniker of Canadian musician Cameron Reed. Reed first came to prominence following the release of two records as Babe Rainbow on the UK-based Warp Records, Shaved EP in 2010 and Endless Path EP in 2011.  Mixing the genres of Dubstep, ambient, hip-hop, and Noise music, Babe Rainbow's early Post-dubstep material was described as "creating "overcast, suffocating sonic landscapes" that evoke a sound "like living in a haunted house".

In addition to providing official remixes for artists such as Grimes, Midnight Juggernauts, and Jokers of the Scene, Reed has provided production to up-and-coming rappers and occasionally releases free EPs of demos and works-in-progress.

In 2012, Reed briefly joined the backing band for Domino Records-signed R&B artist How To Dress Well before going on to release an EP of minimalist piano compositions titled Minnesota Winter EP, and Falling Apart EP which Pitchfork Media called "a momentous, sometime triumphant gloom that recalls a range of other electronic experimentalists".

Reed has been active in the Canadian music industry since the early-2000s as a music writer, concert promoter, and a festival organizer. In 2013, Reed joined the marketing department at the record label Arts & Crafts Productions, home to artists such as Broken Social Scene, Gord Downie, and Feist.

Studio releases

Remixes and singles

References

Canadian experimental musicians
Canadian record producers
Living people
Musicians from Vancouver
Year of birth missing (living people)